The following is a list of libraries in the Marshall Islands.

 Alele Museum and Public Library
 College of the Marshall Islands library, Uliga campus
 College of the Marshall Islands library, Arrak campus
 University of the South Pacific library, Marshall Islands campus

References

 
Marshall Islands
Libraries
Libraries